In film, television, and theatre, typecasting is the process by which a particular actor becomes strongly identified with a specific character, one or more particular roles, or characters having the same traits or coming from the same social or ethnic groups. There have been instances in which an actor has been so strongly identified with a role as to make it difficult for them to find work playing other characters.

Character actors
Actors are sometimes so strongly identified with a role as to make it difficult for them to find work playing other characters. It is especially common among leading actors in popular television series and films.

Star Trek
One example of typecasting occurred with the cast of the original Star Trek series. During Star Treks original run from 1966 to 1969, William Shatner was the highest-paid cast member at $5,000 per episode ($ today), with Leonard Nimoy and the other actors being paid much less. The press predicted that Nimoy would be a star after the series ended, and James Doohan expected that appearing on an NBC series would help his post-Star Trek career. The series so typecast the actors, however—as early as March 1970, Nichelle Nichols complained of Star Trek having "defined [her] so narrowly as an actress"—that only Shatner and Nimoy continued working steadily throughout the 1970s, and even their work received little attention unless it was Star Trek-related. The others' income came mostly from personal appearances at Star Trek conventions attended by Trekkies; by 1978 DeForest Kelley, for example, earned up to $50,000 ($ today) annually. Residuals from the series ended in 1971, but in 1979, the first of six films starring the cast appeared; Kelley earned $1 million for the final film, Star Trek VI: The Undiscovered Country (1991).

Parade stated of the cast in 1978 that "[They] lost control of their destinies the minute they stepped on the bridge of the make-believe Enterprise in 1966", and The New York Times observed in 1991 that "For most of the actors in the original "Star Trek" series, Starfleet has never been far off the professional horizons." Being identified so closely with one role left the series' cast with mixed emotions; Shatner called it "awesome and irksome", and Walter Koenig called it "bittersweet" but admitted that there was "a certain immortality in being associated with Star Trek".

Some of the Next Generation actors also became typecast. Patrick Stewart recalled that a "distinguished Hollywood director I wanted to work for said to me 'Why would I want Captain Picard in my movie?' That was painful". His most prominent non-Star Trek film or television role, Professor X in the X-Men film series, shares similarities to Jean-Luc Picard. Stewart has stated "I don't have a film career. I have a franchise career"; he continues to work on stage as a Shakespearean actor. The Next Generation had one of the largest budgets of its time, and the cast became very wealthy. Jonathan Frakes stated that "it's better to be type-cast than not to be cast at all." Michael Dorn said in 1991, "If what happened to the first cast is called being typecast, then I want to be typecast. Of course, they didn't get the jobs after 'Trek.' But they are making their sixth movie. Name me someone else in television who has made six movies!"

Other examples
John Larroquette said that after winning four consecutive Emmy Awards, "it was 10 years after Night Court ended before I got a role as a dad. Because Dan Fielding was such a bizarre character, he had made such an impression, that typecasting does happen. Every role was some sleazy lawyer or some sleazy this or some sleazy that." During his years on the comedy Married... with Children, Ed O'Neill's scenes were cut from the film drama Flight of the Intruder (1991) after a test audience laughed when he was on the screen.

Jon Hamm stated that after the success of Mad Men, he received "about 40 scripts that were all set in the 60s, or had me playing advertising guys" like his character Don Draper.

Clayton Moore, who played the Lone Ranger in the Golden Age of Television, embraced his typecasting, stating that he had "fallen in love" with the character of Lone Ranger, and regularly appeared in public in character, to the point that Jack Wrather, who owned the character, issued a cease and desist order to Moore in 1979. The dispute was dropped in 1984 and Moore resumed his appearances.

Jonathan Frakes' sentiments about typecasting were echoed by Ben McKenzie, who became a star in the role of Ryan Atwood in The O.C. at age 24, after two years of seeking acting work in New York City and Los Angeles. Eleven years later, after starring in two more television series playing what The New York Times described as a "quiet, guarded leading man", McKenzie said that "if you are being stereotyped, that means you have something to stereotype. So they're casting you. That is an amazing thing. That is a gift. Worry about being pigeonholed in your 50s."

Daniel Radcliffe was cast as Harry Potter at age eleven, playing the character over ten years in an eight-film franchise. Radcliffe was thus faced with two transitions: moving from child actor to adult star and moving from being typecast as Potter to playing other roles. His career following the Harry Potter franchise has included appearing on stage, as in Martin McDonagh's The Cripple of Inishmaan; in independent films such as Kill Your Darlings, in which he played Allen Ginsberg; and major studio films like Victor Frankenstein, in which he played the hunchback Igor, and romantic comedies like What If.

Peter Robbins largely left acting after aging out of his most famous role, the voice of Charlie Brown. He retained a strong affection for the role throughout his life, including having a tattoo of the character.

Historical-real characters
Soviet actor Mikheil Gelovani depicted Joseph Stalin in 12 films made during the leader's lifetime, which reflected his cult of personality. Among them were The Great Dawn (1938), Lenin in 1918 (1939), The Vow (1946), The Fall of Berlin (1950) and The Unforgettable Year 1919 (1952). These films were either banned or had the scenes featuring Stalin removed after the 1956 Secret Speech. Following Stalin's death, Gelovani was denied new roles since he was so closely identified with Stalin. According to The Guinness Book of Movie Facts and Feats, Gelovani had probably portrayed the same historical figure more than any other actor. Die Zeit columnist Andreas Kilb wrote that he ended his life "a pitiful Kagemusha" of Stalin's image.

Playing against type
Some actors attempt to avoid or escape typecasting by choosing roles that are opposite the types of roles that they are known for.

 Tim Burton casting Michael Keaton as Bruce Wayne/Batman in the dark action-drama Batman (1989), when Keaton had previously starred primarily in successful feel-good comedies.
 Bryan Cranston had originally played the immature and childish character Hal on Malcolm in the Middle. When Vince Gilligan approached the AMC about his plan to cast Cranston as the morally dubious Walter White in Breaking Bad, the network was opposed to his casting in light of his previous comedic work.
 Tony Curtis was known as "Hollywood's most handsome matinee idol"; as such, he was cast against type when he played serial killer Albert DeSalvo in The Boston Strangler (1968).
 While Matt Damon was at first best known for his dramatic performance skills, as seen in Good Will Hunting (1997), he was cast against type as an action movie hero in the Jason Bourne films.
 Ice-T, who achieved fame as a gangsta rap artist in his early career, garnered critical acclaim for his subsequent acting roles as police detectives in New Jack City (1991) and Law & Order: Special Victims Unit.
 Gordon Jump, often typecast as milquetoast characters such as Arthur Carlson on WKRP in Cincinnati, took on the role of a child molester in the very special episode "The Bicycle Man" on Diff'rent Strokes. Jump considered the role "one of my most painful but rewarding parts," and the casting against type was noted as a standout moment in Jump's career.
 Sergio Leone casting Henry Fonda, best known for playing morally upright, everyman heroes, as a sadistic villain in the Western Once Upon a Time in the West (1968). Film critic Roger Ebert argued that much of the principal cast in Once Upon a Time in the West were cast against type: "Fonda is the bad guy for once in his career; Charles Bronson is impressively inscrutable as the mysterious good guy; and Jason Robards is a tough guy, believe it or not."
 Michael Mann cast Tom Cruise, typically known for playing heroes, as an amoral hitman in Collateral (2004).
 Matthew McConaughey, who, after making several romantic comedies, sought other, more dramatic film roles. He appeared in a supporting role in The Wolf of Wall Street and starred in Interstellar and Dallas Buyers Club, receiving critical acclaim in all three films and winning the Academy Award for Best Actor for the latter. This change in the direction of his career was called The "McConaissance", and is considered a remarkable career turnaround.
 Glenn Milstead had almost exclusively performed as a woman under his drag queen persona, Divine, performing mostly in the works of John Waters. In 1985, he appeared in what would his be his only male role in Trouble in Mind, a role written for him but against his usual drag type. A second male role in Married... with Children was never filmed, as Milstead died after rehearsals but before taping.
 Leslie Nielsen had an established career as a dramatic actor since the 1950s before appearing in the successful comedy film Airplane! (1980), specifically due to the gravitas he was able to bring to the satire. This prompted a career reinvention that saw Nielsen go on to helm the Police Squad! series and The Naked Gun trilogy. Reflecting on the casting against type, Nielsen later stated that he always felt more comfortable as a deadpan comic and embraced being typecast in that style the rest of his life.
 George Peppard was typecast in "tough-guy" film roles following his portrayal of a young playboy and megalomaniacal tycoon in the 1964 film The Carpetbaggers. His career as a traditional leading man had been fading at the time by 1983, when he accepted the lead role in the TV series The A-Team, as the wisecracking, cigar-smoking head of a team of wanted commandos. Peppard stated he had wanted to transition into character actor roles but had never been given the opportunity until The A-Team.
 Tyler Perry is a comedian best known for his comedy. He went against-type when he was cast as Tanner Bolt, a lawyer that specialized in defending men accused of killing their wives, in Gone Girl (2014).
Bob Saget began his career as a particularly vulgar stand-up comic. In the late 1980s, he was cast against type on television as the squeaky-clean Danny Tanner on Full House, which led to him also hosting the family-friendly America's Funniest Home Videos. Despite his new reputation as "America's Dad" from these roles, Saget maintained his vulgar stand-up routine for the rest of his life and played the contrast between the two types for laughs, which is credited with keeping his appeal fresh among the young adults (millennials) who watched him as children.
 Adam Sandler is best known for his comedy roles, in which he typically plays an "aggressive man-child" and an "extreme character surrounded by regular people." Director Paul Thomas Anderson cast Sandler in a dramatic role in Punch-Drunk Love (2002), as a man facing psychosis who goes "from understated sorrow to rage and back again." He again returned to serious work in The Meyerowitz Stories (2017), with Peter Debruge of Variety writing of his role, "With no shtick to fall back on, Sandler is forced to act, and it's a glorious thing to watch." 
 While James Stewart was known for his "affable" everyman roles, such as a businessman and father in It's a Wonderful Life, in Alfred Hitchcock's Vertigo (1958), he was cast against type as a "troubling or unsettling" character whose "mind unravels" until he attains a "cold, chilling air of sexual paranoia and control."
 John Wayne, known for playing heroic cowboys/lawmen, played antihero Rooster Cogburn in True Grit (1969). Wayne was cast against type several times in his career, including as Genghis Khan in The Conqueror (1956).
 Betty White, known for playing the sexually liberated character Sue Ann Nivens on The Mary Tyler Moore Show, and Rue McClanahan, who had been known for playing scatterbrained characters such as Vivian Harmon in Maude and Fran Crowley in Mama's Family, were cast in opposite types in The Golden Girls: White played the naive Rose Nylund, and McClanahan played sultry Southern belle Blanche Devereaux. Bea Arthur, for whom the lead role of Dorothy Zbornak had been conceived, was initially reluctant to join the cast, thinking that the typecasting would prompt viewers to see White and McClanahan as simply continuing their previous roles, but the "flip-flop" casting of the two types, and the originality of the show's premise, convinced her to sign on to the project.
 Robin Williams was a successful comedian and situation comedy actor. He was cast against type in Insomnia and One Hour Photo (both 2002), two movies in which he depicted "spine-chilling psychosis" and insanity.

See also
 Child actor
 Brat pack – 1980s
 Brit Pack – 1980s
 Frat Pack – 1990s and 2000s
 Rat Pack – 1950s and 1960s
 Stunt casting

References

Acting